John Charles Chenoweth McKinsey (30 April 1908 – 26 October 1953), usually cited as J. C. C. McKinsey, was an American mathematician known for his work on mathematical logic and game theory. He also made significant contributions to modal logic.

Biography
McKinsey received B.S. and M.S. degrees from New York University and a Ph.D. degree in 1936 from the University of California, Berkeley. He was a Blumenthal Research Fellow at New York University from 1936 to 1937 and a Guggenheim Fellow from 1942 to 1943.  He also taught at Montana State College, and in Nevada, then Oklahoma, and in 1947 he went "to a research group at Douglas Aircraft Corporation" that later became the RAND Corporation.

McKinsey worked at RAND until he was fired in 1951. The FBI considered him a security risk because he was a homosexual, in spite of the fact that he was an open homosexual who had been in a committed relationship for years. He complained to his superior "How can anyone threaten me with disclosure when everybody already knows?"

From 1951 he taught at Stanford University, where he was later appointed a Full Professor in the Department of Philosophy, where he worked with Patrick Suppes on the axiomatic foundations of classical mechanics.  He committed suicide at his home in Palo Alto in 1953.

Bibliography
 (originally publ. McGraw-Hill, 1952)

McKinsey, J. C. C., Tarski, Alfred (1944). "The algebra of topology." Annals of mathematics, 141–191. https://doi.org/10.2307/1969080.
McKinsey, J. C., Tarski, Alfred (1946). "On closed elements in closure algebras." Annals of mathematics, 122–162. https://doi.org/10.2307/1969038.
McKinsey, J. C. C. (1941). "A solution of the decision problem for the Lewis systems S2 and S4, with an application to topology." The Journal of Symbolic Logic. 6 (4), 117–124. doi:10.2307/2267105

References

1908 births
1953 deaths
American logicians
Game theorists
LGBT people from Indiana
American LGBT scientists
New York University alumni
University of California, Berkeley alumni
Stanford University Department of Philosophy faculty
RAND Corporation people
20th-century American mathematicians
Mathematicians from Indiana
Gay academics
Gay scientists
1953 suicides
20th-century American LGBT people
Suicides in California